Anne de Pisseleu d'Heilly, Duchess of Étampes, (15081580) was chief mistress of Francis I of France. She became Francis' mistress following his return from captivity in 1526. Anne enriched her family and friends through her courtly influence and after Francis' death was banished from court and temporarily imprisoned in her husband's castle. She would spend her later years ensuring the fortune of her family. Anne died in 1580.

King's mistress 
Born in 1508, Anne was the daughter of Guillaume de Pisseleu, seigneur d'Heilly, a nobleman of Picardy, and Anne Sanguin. She came to court before 1522  and was one of the maids-of-honour of Marie of Luxembourg and later Louise of Savoy, Duchess of Angoulême, the mother of Francis I. Francis made Anne his mistress, probably upon his return from his captivity at Madrid (1526), and soon gave up his long-term mistress, Françoise de Foix, for her.

Anne was described as being sprightly, pretty, witty and cultured, "the most beautiful among the learned and the most learned among the beautiful". The liaison received some official recognition when Francis started wearing Anne's colors. Anne was appointed lady-in-waiting to the new queen, Eleanor of Austria, and later became governess to Francis' two daughters. She used her influence with Francis to elevate and enrich her family; her brother, Adrien sieur d'Heilly, was made captain of the Picard legion, her uncle, Antoine Sanguin, being made Bishop of Orléans in 1533 and a cardinal in 1539; her three other brothers were made bishops. In 1534, Francis gave her in marriage to Jean IV de Brosse, whom he created Duke of Étampes.

Court influence
With the political fall of the Duke of Montmorency in 1540, Anne became all-powerful at court. Surrounded by those seeking royal favor, she dominated court functions. Foreign diplomats quickly learned they had to gain Anne's favor for their plans to have any chance in succeeding. In doing so, she usurped Queen Eleanor's position at court. Anne later illustrated her political influence by having Admiral Chabot released and returned to court, marrying her sister Louise to Chabot's nephew in the process.

Despite her capabilities, Anne was of a fickle nature. In 1545, she tried to discredit Admiral d'Annebault, despite him owing his advancement to her. When her intrigues were discouraged by Archbishop Tournon, Anne attempted to bring about his fall on a charge of dishonesty.

The influence of Anne, especially in the last years of Francis' reign, continued to grow. A staunch Protestant, she counseled Francis on toleration for Huguenots. By October 1546, Anne, along with Cardinal du Bellay, was pressuring Francis to break with Rome. Due to her influence Francis was attending more council meetings, and according to an imperial envoy, Anne was "the real president of the king's most private and intimate council".

Basking in her success at bringing peace between Francis and Charles at Crepy in 1544, Anne convinced Francis that his son the Dauphin Henry and Diane de Poitiers were working to reinstate Montmorency at court. Francis, so instructed, banished Diane from court. In response, Henry and his supporters retreated to the chateau of Anet; father and son would not reconcile until 1545.

Loss of position
Despite having influence at Francis' court, Anne had made many enemies: Henry, his mistress, Diane de Poitiers, and Anne de Montmorency were among them. Following Francis' death in March 1547, Henry, now king, had Anne dismissed from the court and confiscated her possessions. By 1548, Anne was facing the threat of trial for heresy. Henry chose not to pursue this possibly out of respect for his father. Her husband accused her of theft of his governorship salary and disgracing his family, and had Anne confined temporarily to the castle of La Hardoinaye.

Anne was still a wealthy woman, having properties in Paris and a capital of 47,615 livres in rentes. By 1554-55 she was maintaining her niece Jossine de Pisseleu's rights to the Lenoncourt succession from the Guise family. In March 1560, she gave 114,000 livres for the marriage of her niece Diane de Barbancon to her husband Jean de Rohan, baron de Frontenay. Anne gave 30,000 livres for her nephew Jean d'Heilly's first marriage, and acted as the intermediary for Jean's second marriage, writing to the lady's ward. She continued to be involved in the lives of her nieces and nephews into her later years.

Anne died in 1580.

References

Sources

External links

Portrait of the duchesse d'Étampes, attributed to Corneille de Lyon (Metropolitan Museum of Art)

French duchesses
Anne
1508 births
1580 deaths
Dukes of Étampes
Mistresses of Francis I of France
French ladies-in-waiting
French maids of honour
16th-century French people
16th-century French women